Timothy Sheehy (17 June 1895 – 15 February 1968) was an Irish politician. He was first elected to Dáil Éireann as a Fianna Fáil Teachta Dála (TD) for the Tipperary constituency at the September 1927 general election. He was re-elected at the 1932 general election but lost his seat at the 1933 general election. He stood as a Clann na Talmhan candidate at the 1943 general election but was not elected.

References

1895 births
1968 deaths
Fianna Fáil TDs
Members of the 6th Dáil
Members of the 7th Dáil
Politicians from County Tipperary
Irish farmers
Clann na Talmhan politicians